The Church of la Buena Dicha (Spanish: Iglesia de la Buena Dicha) is a church located in Madrid, Spain. 

It was built in 1914–1917 at the site of a former hospital and church. 
The architectural style is eclectic with Gothic Revival influence. 
The building was declared Bien de Interés Cultural in 1994.

See also 
Catholic Church in Spain
List of oldest church buildings

References

External links 

Buena Dicha
Bien de Interés Cultural landmarks in Madrid
Gothic Revival architecture in Madrid
20th-century Roman Catholic church buildings in Spain
Buildings and structures in Universidad neighborhood, Madrid
Gothic Revival church buildings in Spain